Willie Montrel Young (born June 15, 1973) is an American professional basketball coach and former professional basketball player.

Career 
Young graduated from Norview High School in 1992, before playing college basketball at Brevard Community College (1992–95) and at the University of Tennessee at Chattanooga (1995–97). As a senior, he was the Mocs second-leading scorer (14.0ppg) and helped the team reach the 1997 NCAA Sweet Sixteen.

He turned professional in 1998 and spent nine years playing overseas in the Netherlands, Israel, Belgium and Germany. As a rookie, Young helped BV Den Helder win the Dutch national championship. Young, who spent the last three years of his playing days with the Crailsheim Merlins in Germany's second-tier league 2. Bundesliga, suffered a career-ending knee injury in February 2007.

In 2008, Young began his coaching career as head coach of Crailsheim's development squad, while also coaching in the club's youth ranks. In August 2012, Young was promoted to the head coaching position at Crailsheim's first team in the ProA league. In 2014, he guided the Merlins to a second-place finish in the ProA regular season and to an appearance in the finals, which earned his team promotion to Germany's top-flight Basketball Bundesliga. He was sacked in November 2014 after a 1–8 season start.

In August 2017, he was hired as head basketball coach for the Sequatchie County High School Indians in Dunlap, Tennessee. Young worked there until 2019, in September 2020, he was appointed as boys basketball coach at Pajaro Valley High School in Watsonville, California. Young coached the Pajaro Valley Grizzlies in the 2020-21 season.

References

External links 
 Basketball Resume
 Eurobasket profile

1973 births
Living people
American men's basketball coaches
American expatriate basketball people in Germany
American expatriate basketball people in the Netherlands
American men's basketball players
Chattanooga Mocs men's basketball players
Crailsheim Merlins coaches
Crailsheim Merlins players
Den Helder Kings players
Heroes Den Bosch players
Dutch Basketball League players
Landstede Hammers players